The Texas Rangers 1993 season involved the Rangers finishing 2nd in the American League West with a record of 86 wins and 76 losses. Before the 1993 season, Nolan Ryan announced his retirement, effective at the end of that season. It would also be the team's final year at Arlington Stadium before moving to The Ballpark in Arlington.

Offseason
December 15, 1992: Tom Henke was signed as a free agent with the Texas Rangers.
December 18, 1992: Rob Ducey was signed as a free agent with the Texas Rangers. 
December 19, 1992: Manuel Lee was signed as a free agent with the Texas Rangers.
December 19, 1992: Doug Dascenzo was signed as a free agent with the Texas Rangers.
January 13, 1993: Mario Díaz was signed as a free agent with the Texas Rangers.
February 1, 1993: Billy Ripken was signed as a free agent with the Texas Rangers.
February 8, 1993: Steve Balboni was signed as a free agent with the Texas Rangers.
March 22, 1993: Mike Schooler was signed as a free agent with the Texas Rangers.

Regular season
 On May 26, 1993, during a game against the Cleveland Indians, Carlos Martínez hit a fly ball that Canseco lost in the lights as he was crossing the warning track. The ball hit him in the head and bounced over the wall for a home run. The cap  Jose was wearing on that play, which This Week in Baseball rated in 1998 as the greatest blooper of the show's first 21 years, is in the Seth Swirsky collection. After the incident, the Harrisburg Heat offered him a soccer contract.
 May 29, 1993 – José Canseco asked his manager, Kevin Kennedy, to let him pitch the eighth inning of a runaway loss to the Boston Red Sox. While pitching, he injured his arm, underwent Tommy John surgery, and was lost for the remainder of the season, leading him to suffer further indignity and ridicule.
On August 4, just before the end, Ryan had yet another high-profile moment – this time an on-the-mound fight. After Ryan hit Robin Ventura of the Chicago White Sox, Ventura charged the mound in order to fight Ryan, who was 20 years his senior. Ryan secured the 26-year-old Ventura in a headlock with his left arm, while pummelling Ventura's head with his right fist six times before catcher Iván Rodríguez was able to pull Ventura away from Ryan. Ryan stated afterwards it was the same maneuver he used on steers he had to brand on his Texas ranch. Videos of the incident were played that evening throughout the country. While Ventura and White Sox manager Gene Lamont were ejected, Ryan–who had barely moved from his spot on the mound in the fracas–was allowed to remain in the game and pitched hitless ball the rest of the way. Ryan had determined to be more aggressive after coming out on the wrong side of an altercation with Dave Winfield's beating in 1980.<ref>Freeman, Denne H. "Raging Ryan strikes Ventura." Austin American-Statesman, August 5, 1993. Page C1.</ref>
 September 17, 1993: Greg Myers of the Angels was the final strikeout victim of Nolan Ryan. It would be Ryan's 5,714th strikeout.
On September 22, 1993, Nolan Ryan's arm finally gave out. In Seattle, Ryan tore a ligament, ending his career two starts earlier than planned.  Briefly attempting to pitch past the injury, Ryan threw one further pitch after tearing his ligament; with his injured arm, his final pitch was measured at 98 miles per hour.  Ryan's last start was his worst; he allowed a single, four walks, and a grand slam in the top of the first without recording an out. (Ryan left trailing 5-0, and the fourth walk was completed by a reliever after Ryan's injury, but credited to Ryan.)

Season standings

 Record vs. opponents 

 Notable transactions 
September 11, 1993: Mike Schooler was released by the Texas Rangers.

Roster

Player stats

Batting

Starters by positionNote: G = Games played; AB = At bats; R = Runs; H = Hits; Avg. = Batting average; HR = Home runs; RBI = Runs batted in; SB = Stolen basesOther battersNote: G = Games played; AB = At bats; R = Runs; H = Hits; Avg. = Batting average; HR = Home runs; RBI = Runs batted in; SB = Stolen bases Pitching 

 Starting pitchers Note: G = Games pitched; IP = Innings pitched; W = Wins; L = Losses; ERA = Earned run average; SO = Strikeouts Other pitchers Note: G = Games pitched; IP = Innings pitched; W = Wins; L = Losses; ERA = Earned run average; SO = Strikeouts Relief pitchers Note: G = Games pitched; IP = Innings pitched; W = Wins; L = Losses; SV = Saves; ERA = Earned run average; SO = StrikeoutsAwards and honors
Juan González,  A.L. Home Run Champ
Juan González, Silver Slugger Award
Iván Rodríguez, C, Gold Glove
All-Star Game

 Farm system 

LEAGUE CHAMPIONS: GCL Rangers

 Notes 

 References 
1993 Texas Rangers at Baseball Reference1993 Texas Rangers at Baseball Almanac''

Texas Rangers seasons
Texas Rangers season
Texas Rangers